Sara Goller is a former professional German beach volleyball player.

Initially paired with Frederike Romberg, Goller won the U20 European Championships in Salzburg before changing to her current partner, Laura Ludwig. Together, Goller and Ludwig became 2006 German champions, won the U23 European Championships in St. Pölten and ended fourth in the women's European Championships the same year in The Hague. They continued their line of success in 2007, defending the German title and winning the silver medal in the European Championships in Valencia. Goller and Ludwig ended the 2007 season as leaders in the German women's ranking and are placed 7th overall.

She won 2 silver medals at the 2007 and 2009 European Beach Volleyball Championships and 2 golden medals at the 2008 and 2010 Beach ECH alongside her former teammate Laura Ludwig.

They competed at the 2008 and 2012 Summer Olympics, finishing in 9th place at the 2008 Olympics and reaching the quarterfinals in 2012.

References

External links
 
 Official website (archived)
 Sara Goller @ dvv.de
 

Living people
People from Starnberg
Sportspeople from Upper Bavaria
German women's beach volleyball players
Beach volleyball players at the 2008 Summer Olympics
Beach volleyball players at the 2012 Summer Olympics
Olympic beach volleyball players of Germany
Academic staff of Leipzig University
Volleyball players from Berlin
German women's volleyball players
Year of birth missing (living people)